Haradasun (foaled 28 November 2003) was an Australian Thoroughbred racehorse. His most significant wins include the 2007 Group 1 Doncaster Handicap and George Ryder Stakes in Australia and the Queen Anne Stakes in Britain in 2008.

Background
Haradasun is a brown horse sired by Fusaichi Pegasus (USA) from Circles of Gold (AJC Oaks) by Marscay. His sire is a Kentucky Derby winner by champion sire Mr Prospector. Haradasun is named after the boxer, 'Fighting Harada'. He was originally trained by Tony Vasil, who also trained his half-brother Elvstroem. He has been ridden by jockeys Glen Boss and Nash Rawiller. His earnings so far are A$2,731,170.

Racing record
Haradasun won his only two-year-old start at Swan Hill by ten lengths. In his first start as a three-year-old, he impressively won the listed 1,200 metre Vain Stakes at Caulfield in Melbourne. In his next start, he  lost to the reigning champion two-year-old, Miss Finland, in the HDF McNeil Quality, again at Caulfield over 1,200 metres. Haradasun looked to be a real contender for the 2006 Melbourne Spring Racing Carnival but his trainer, Tony Vasil, noticed he was slightly lame in one leg after he had cooled down one morning after track work. A series of X-rays were taken of his legs, all showing no problems except for the last one taken. This X-ray revealed a slight crack to a cannon bone and Haradasun was immediately spelled for three months. He made a successful return to racing in 2007 Zeditave Stakes at listed level.

Haradasun, ridden by Nash Rawiller, was defeated by the three-year-old filly Catechuchu in the Schweppes Stakes on Blue Diamond Stakes day at Caulfield in February 2007. In next month, he finished fourth to Miss Finland in the Australian Guineas, won the George Ryder Stakes at Rosehill in Sydney before winning the Group 1 Doncaster Handicap mile at Royal Randwick. He looked on track to win the Queen Elizabeth Stakes, but he was beaten into second place by two lengths by the Gai Waterhouse trained Desert War.

Coolmore Stud buy-out
Coolmore Stud, an international breeding company, bought a half share in Haradasun for $20 million, and they replaced Rawiller with Damien Oliver, for the rest of the 2007 season. After running several minor places, Haradasun finished third in the  2,040m Cox Plate at Moonee Valley on 27 October 2007.

Racing in 2008
Haradasun won in the Group One Queen Anne Stakes at Royal Ascot on 17 June 2008.

Race record
1st:
 Queen Anne Stakes 1600m (G1) Ascot 2008
 Doncaster Handicap 1600m (G1) Randwick 2007
 George Ryder Stakes 1500m (G1) Rosehill 2007
 Wellington R C Stakes 1400m (Listed) Caulfield 2007
 Vain Stakes 1100m (Listed) Caulfield 2006
 Zedative Stakes 1200m (Listed) Caulfield 2007
 2YO Handicap 1300m Swan Hill
2nd:
 Queen Elizabeth Stakes 2000m (G1) Randwick 2007
 Dato Tan Chin Name Stakes (G2) Moonee Valley 2007
 McNeil Stakes 1200m (G3) Caulfield 2006
 Schweppes Stakes 1400m (G3) Caulfield 2007
 Bletchingly Stakes 1200m (G3) Caulfield 2007
3rd
 Cox Plate 2040m (G1) Moonee Valley 2007
4th:
 Cadbury Guineas 1600m (G1) Caulfield 2007

Stud record
Haradasun was retired to stand at the Coolmore Stud where in 2008 he covered 133 mares at $55,000 a mare. His service fee for 2009 is $35,750.

References

 Coolmore and Damien Oliver on Haradasun
 Stud Prospect

External links
 Haradasun website

2003 racehorse births
Racehorses bred in Australia
Racehorses trained in Australia
Thoroughbred family 22-b